XGRA: Extreme-G Racing Association is a futuristic racing video game, the fourth and final installment in the Extreme-G series, following Extreme-G 3. This game features more tracks as well as a brand new weapon system.

Overview

Gameplay is similar but slightly different to previous games in the series. A returning feature is the ability to break the sound barrier: upon reaching 750 mph, all sound effects will cut out, except for item collection sound, other rider's taunts, weapons firing, and in-game music.

XGRA allows players to race for 8 different teams, with each team's bike having their own advantages and drawbacks such as Regeneration, Handling, Speed, Acceleration and Shielding.

Reception

XGRA: Extreme-G Racing Association received "average" reviews on all platforms according to the review aggregation website Metacritic.

References

External links
 

2003 video games
Acclaim Entertainment games
Science fiction racing games
GameCube games
PlayStation 2 games
Video games developed in the United Kingdom
Xbox games